Harold Addison Woodruff (10 July 1877 – 1 May 1966) was an Australian veterinary pathologist and bacteriologist. He was born on 10 July 1877 in Sheffield, Yorkshire, England to Herbert Woodruff and Mary, née Addison. He was raised Methodist and remained active, including attending to weekly prayer meetings for students at the University of Melbourne.

Career 
Woodruff was educated at Wesley College, Sheffield, England, and graduated at the Royal Veterinary College, London, England. He tutored in surgery there in 1898-1899 and then became a professor in veterinary science and bacteriology at the Royal Agricultural University, Cirencester, Gloucestershire, United Kingdom. He returned in 1900 to the Royal Veterinary College as a professor of materia medica and hygiene. From 1900 to 1908, he was appointed chair of veterinary medicine and ran an extensive out-patient clinic. In 1912, he graduated with an English Conjoint License - M.R.C.S., L.R.C.P. and transferred to Australia as professor of veterinary pathology and director of the veterinary institute at the University of Melbourne.

Military career 
In October 1915, Woodruff joined the Australian Imperial Force as a major in the Australian Army Veterinary Corps (A.D.V.S. Third Division), serving in Egypt and France to fight World War I. He was permitted to return home in 1917 due to the decline of the veterinary school.

Later Years 
At the age of 51 in 1928, Woodruff accepted a post as director of the bacteriology department at Melbourne University when the veterinary school finally closed. His efforts expanded the department, he influenced a number of notable scientists, and, most importantly, he established the Public Health Laboratories, now known as the Microbiological Diagnostic Unit at the Melbourne University. Throughout his career, he published a number of monographs, pamphlets and articles on veterinary medicine, medical issues, and theological issues. Woodruff delayed retirement until 1944 at the age of 57, but continued to be active in church activities, the peace movement, and music. In 1946, he was elected chairman of the Zoological Board of Victoria.

Personal life 
Woodruff married Margaret Ada, née Cooper, on 11 July 1908 in Finchley, Middlesex, England. She died in 1916. On 24 June 1919 Woodruff married Isabella Scott Scoular Glaister. After her death on 3 March 1954 Woodruff returned to Britain.
He died on 1 May 1966 at the age of 89 in Edinburgh, Scotland. He was survived by his two sons from his first wife, Michael and Phillip.

Works 
 A Pure Milk Supply by H. A. Woodruff
 I.H.S., Jesus Saviour of Men by H. A. Woodruff
 Emmanuel - God With Us: A Study on the Incarnation by H. A. Woodruff
 If I Were a Jew by H. A. Woodruff / If I Were a Christian by H. M. Saenger and H. A. Woodruff
 This "Liquor Tyranny" by Professor H.A. Woodruff
 Education, What Part Shall the Church Play? by H. A. Woodruff
 Research and the Pastoral Industry by T. Brailsford Robertson and H. A. Woodruff
 The Causation and Prevention of Puerperal Infection by R. Marshall Allan and H. A. Woodruff
 World Order or Anarchy? by H. A. Woodruff

References

 TROV – The National Library of Australia http://trove.nla.gov.au/people/512216?c=people
 Environment, Economy and Australian Biology 1890-1939 Historical Studies 21 11-28 : Environment, Economy and Australian Biology 1890-1939
 Schedvin, C. B.
 Woodruff, Harold Addison (1877-1966), Veterinary Pathologist and Bacteriologist Australian Dictionary of Biography John Ritchie 12 562-563 : Woodruff, Harold Addison (1877-1966), Veterinary Pathologist and Bacteriologist Killip, Norah L., Published: Melbourne University Press
 Arthur William Turner 1900-1989 Historical Records of Australian Science 9 1 49-63 : Arthur William Turner 1900-1989
 French, E. L. and Sutherland, A. K.

Academic staff of the University of Melbourne
Australian Army officers
Australian bacteriologists
Australian Methodists
British expatriates in Australia
1877 births
1966 deaths
Australian veterinarians
Male veterinarians
People educated at Wesley College, Sheffield
British veterinarians
Academics of the Royal Agricultural University